Alkalibacillus almallahensis is a Gram-positive, halophilic, endospore-forming, rod-shaped and non-motile bacterium from the genus Alkalibacillus which has been isolated from sediments from a saltern from La Malahá in Spain.

References

 

Bacillaceae
Bacteria described in 2014